Mar-Kyuyol (Maar Küöl) is a rural locality (a selo), the only inhabited locality, and the administrative center of Mar-Kyuyolsky Rural Okrug of Suntarsky District in the Sakha Republic, Russia, located  from Suntar, the administrative center of the district. Its population as of the 2010 Census was 506, down from 628 recorded during the 2002 Census.

References

Notes

Sources
Official website of the Sakha Republic. Registry of the Administrative-Territorial Divisions of the Sakha Republic. Suntarsky District. 

Rural localities in Suntarsky District